Eroica may refer to:

Music
 Symphony No. 3 (Beethoven) (Sinfonia Eroica, 1801), by Ludwig van Beethoven
 The Eroica Variations (Variations and Fugue for Piano in E♭ major, Opus 35, 1802), by Ludwig van Beethoven
 Transcendental Étude No. 7 in E-flat, "Eroica" (1837), by Franz Liszt
 The Internet Symphony No. 1 — Eroica, by Tan Dun for the YouTube Symphony Orchestra
 The Eroica Trio, an American chamber music ensemble
 Eroica (album), an album by Wendy & Lisa

Film
Eroica (1958 film), a film by Andrzej Munk
Eroica (1949 film), a black-and-white film about Beethoven
Our Last Spring (Eroica), a 1960 Greek film with an international cast
Eroica (2003 film), a film about Beethoven produced for television by the BBC, starring Ian Hart

Other
Eroica, a collaboration wine between Chateau Ste. Michelle and Dr. Ernst Loosen
 Monte Paschi Eroica, a bicycle race in Italy
From Eroica with Love, a long-running shōjo manga by Yasuko Aoike
 L'Eroica, an annual non-competitive ride on vintage bicycles